Inver is a small village in County Donegal, Ireland. It lies on the N56 National secondary road midway between Killybegs to the west and Donegal Town to the east. It is also a civil parish in the historic barony of Banagh.

History

Inver is sometimes known as the hidden jewel of the northwest. Inver was an important whaling post in Ireland. There was a large whaling station and fleet in the Port of Inver which lies 2 km from Inver Village. Thomas Nesbitt was the head of this investment. He also increased productivity by inventing the harpoon gun. The ruins of the old whaling station still remain in the port but has eroded and deteriorated to rubble. Inver has an excellent football pitch which hosts Eany Celtic in the Donegal League. There are two churches located in Inver, the Catholic church which stands on a hill in a place named Ardaghey. It also hosts a Church of Ireland church which is located beside the river in an area known as Cranny. The two churches stand over-looking each other. Two stores have existed for years of which one is known as Cassidy's store that was and still is run by the Cassidy family of Inver. Spar was opened in the 80's and rivalry has followed between the two stores ever since. Spar is no longer open, closing in 2014 in part due to increased competition with shops such as Aldi and Lidl in Donegal town. Cassidy's shop also functions as the local post office.
Inver Grove Heights, Minnesota may be named after Inver.

Transport
Inver railway station opened on 18 August 1893 and finally closed on 1 January 1960.

Civil parish of Inver
The civil parish contains the villages of Inver, Frosses and Mountcharles.

Townlands
The civil parish contains the following townlands:

Altcor
Ardaght Glebe
Ardbane
Ballybrollaghan
Ballymacahil
Bonnyglen
Brenter
Buncronan
Carraduffy
Carrakeel
Casheloogary
Clogheravaddy
Cloverhill (also known as Drumbeg)
Coolshangan
Cranny Lower
Cranny Upper
Creevins
Cronacarckfree
Cronaslieve
Crumlin
Derryhirk
Disert
Dromore
Drumadart
Drumagraa
Drumaneary
Drumard
Drumatumpher
Drumbaran
Drumbeagh
Drumbeg (also known as Cloverhill
Drumboarty
Drumcoe
Drumconor
Drumduff
Drumfin
Drumgorman
Drumgorman Barr
Drumkeelan
Drumlaghtafin
Drummacachapple
Drummacacullen
Drummeenanagh
Drumnacarry
Drumnaheark East
Drumnaheark West
Drumnakilly
Drumnalost
Drumrainy
Drumrone
Eagle's Nest
Edenamuck
Fanaghans
Gargrim
Glencoagh
Gortaward
Hall Demesne
Inver Glebe
Keeloges
Killin
Kilmacreddan
Knockagar
Knocknahorna
Leagans
Legnawley Glebe
Letterbarra
Letterfad
Lettermore
Letternacahy
Lettertreane
Luaghnabrogue
Meenacahan
Meenacharbet
Meenacloghspar
Meenacurrin
Meenagranoge
Meenagrau
Meenaguse Beg
Meenawullaghan
Meentacor
Meentacreeghan
Meentanakill
Meenybraddan
Mountcharles
Mullanboys
Munterneese
Point
Port
Rafoarty
Raneely
Rock
Roes
Sallows
Salthill Demesne
Seahill and Tuckmill Hill
Sheskinatawy
Tamur
Tawnygorm
Tievachorky
Tievedooly
Tonregee
Tuckmill Hill & Seahill
Tullinlagan
Tullinlough
Tullycumber
Tullynaglack
Tullynagreana
Tullynaha
Tullytrasna
Tullyvoos

See also
 List of towns and villages in Ireland
 Aber and Inver (placename elements)

References

 
Towns and villages in County Donegal